K33DB-D, virtual channel 9 (UHF digital channel 33), is a low-power television station licensed to Alexandria, Minnesota, United States. Owned by Selective TV, Inc., it is a translator of Minneapolis-licensed Fox owned-and-operated station KMSP-TV (channel 9).

History
From its sign-on in 1991 until 2018, It is one of two rebroadcasters of The Weather Channel using a free-to-air signal, the other being K34HO-D (channel 34) in nearby Willmar. It used a Weather Star 4000 (Star ID 006216) much like K34HO-D for local weather data.

In the fall of 2018, K50DB dropped The Weather Channel from its lineup and became a translator station for tKMSP-TV.

References

External links

Television stations in Minnesota
Low-power television stations in the United States
Television channels and stations established in 1993
1993 establishments in Minnesota